The Great Outdoors (formerly TGO) is a British monthly consumer magazine focused on hillwalking and backpacking, first published in 1978. It was edited for many years by Cameron McNeish. Chris Townsend, Jim Perrin, David Lintern and Alex Roddie are among many regular and long-term contributors to the magazine. The current editor is Carey Davies, and the online editor is Hanna Lindon.

The Great Outdoors was published by Newquest until October 2015, when it was sold to Kelsey Media. Kelsey Media's headquarters are based in Cudham, Kent.

The Great Outdoors is the main sponsor of the TGO Challenge, an annual coast-to-coast backpacking event in Scotland, invented by Hamish Brown and originally called the Ultimate Challenge.

The magazine also hosts annual awards to celebrate the outdoor industry.

References

External links
 Official website 
 The TGO Challenge

Sports magazines published in the United Kingdom
Monthly magazines published in the United Kingdom
Magazines established in 1978
Mass media in Kent